Frederick O'Neal Vinson (born January 28, 1971) is an American professional basketball coach and former player who serves as assistant coach for the New Orleans Pelicans of the National Basketball Association (NBA). At  and  he played guard.

Born in Murfreesboro, North Carolina, Vinson attended Georgia Institute of Technology and Chowan Junior College (North Carolina). As a guard at Georgia Tech he was named MVP for the 1993–94 team. During that season he was also the team's third leading scorer. Specializing in long range shooting, Vinson led the Yellow Jackets in three-point field goals (70) and three point percentage (.402). In the 1994–95 NBA season he played five games with the Atlanta Hawks, scoring four total points. During the 1999–2000 NBA season, he played eight games with the Seattle SuperSonics, averaging 1.6 points per game. Vinson also played with the Atlanta Trojans of the United States Basketball League (USBL) in 1994, and with the Mexico Aztecas of the Continental Basketball Association (CBA) in 1994–95.

On August 25, 2008, Vinson was named assistant coach/director of player programs for the Los Angeles Clippers.

On August 4, 2010, Vinson was named an assistant coach of the New Orleans Hornets, along with Randy Ayers. Vinson and the Pelicans made the playoffs in 2011 and they reached the Western Conference Playoffs during the 2014–15 season. On November 16, 2020, Vinson was retained as assistant coach.

References

External links

 Fred Vinson coach file at NBA.com
Vinson named Assistant Coach @ hornets.com

1971 births
Living people
American expatriate basketball people in France
American expatriate basketball people in Israel
American expatriate basketball people in Mexico
American expatriate basketball people in Poland
American expatriate basketball people in Venezuela
American men's basketball coaches
American men's basketball players
Atlanta Hawks players
Basketball coaches from North Carolina
Basketball players from North Carolina
Chowan Hawks men's basketball players
Cocodrilos de Caracas players
Fort Wayne Fury players
Gaiteros del Zulia players
Georgia Tech Yellow Jackets men's basketball players
Guaiqueríes de Margarita players
Junior college men's basketball players in the United States
Long Beach Jam players
Los Angeles Clippers assistant coaches
Mexico Aztecas players
New Orleans Hornets assistant coaches
New Orleans Pelicans assistant coaches
People from Murfreesboro, North Carolina
Seattle SuperSonics players
Shooting guards
Śląsk Wrocław basketball players
SLUC Nancy Basket players
Undrafted National Basketball Association players
Yakima Sun Kings players